Borane–tetrahydrofuran is a dipolar bond charge-transfer complex composed of borane and tetrahydrofuran (THF). These solutions are used for reductions and hydroboration, reactions that are useful in synthesis of organic compounds.

Preparation and uses
The complex is commercially available but can also be generated by the dissolution of diborane in THF. A practical route to this is the oxidation of sodium borohydride with iodine in THF.

The complex can reduce carboxylic acids to alcohols and is a common route for the reduction of amino acids to amino alcohols (e.g. valinol). It adds across alkenes to give organoboron compounds that are useful intermediates. The following organoboron reagents are prepared from borane-THF: 9-borabicyclo[3.3.1]nonane, Alpine borane, diisopinocampheylborane.  It is also used as a source of borane (BH3) for the formation of adducts.

Safety
The solution is highly sensitive to air, requiring the use of air-free techniques.

See also 
 Ammonia borane
 Borane dimethylsulfide
 Borane tert-butylamine

References

Boranes
Reagents for organic chemistry